Angus MacAskill (1825 – 8 August 1863) was a Scottish-born Canadian giant.

Early life
MacAskill was born on the Isle of Berneray in the Sound of Harris, Scotland. He had twelve siblings, several of whom died young, and he was an ordinary-sized baby. After several years in Stornoway, Outer Hebrides, the family settled in the fishing community of Englishtown, Cape Breton Island, around 1831.

Young MacAskill was said to be of normal stature, but in entering his adolescence he began to grow rapidly and by his 20th year had attained , eventually reaching  within another year or two. He had "deep-set blue eyes and a musical, if somewhat hollow voice"; and "a mild and gentle manner." Despite his size he was well proportioned.

He was known in his home community of St. Anns as "Gille Mòr" (translated to "Big Boy"). He was also known to many as the "Cape Breton Giant" or simply "Giant MacAskill."

When MacAskill was approximately 14 years old he travelled on a fishing schooner from St. Anns to North Sydney and the crew took him along to a dance.  An altercation with a dancer led to  MacAskill striking his tormentor's jaw with his fist. The man landed in the middle of the floor and was unconscious for so long the other dancers thought he was dead. When the captain returned to his schooner he found MacAskill on his knees praying that he had not killed the man.

Adult career
MacAskill was rumored for feats of strength such as lifting a ship's anchor weighing  to chest height, and an ability to carry barrels weighing over  apiece under each arm or reputedly able to lift a hundredweight, i.e. , with two fingers and hold it at arm's length for ten minutes.

In 1849, he entered show business and went to work for P. T. Barnum's circus, appearing next to General Tom Thumb.  In 1853 he toured the West Indies and Cuba. Queen Victoria heard stories about MacAskill's great strength and invited him to appear before her to give a demonstration at Windsor Castle, after which she proclaimed him to be "the tallest, stoutest and strongest man to ever enter the palace", and presented him with two gold rings in appreciation.

The fishermen of St. Anns envied MacAskill's strength. While they laboriously bailed their boats, MacAskill set his weight under his two-ton boat, tipped it on its beam ends and reportedly emptied the bilge water. He reportedly single-handedly set a  mast into a schooner. He was also said to have been able to lift a fully grown horse over a four-foot fence.

There are various accounts of an incident with an anchor that may have taken place in New York or New Orleans. French sailors apparently taunted MacAskill to lift an anchor lying on the wharf, which was estimated to weigh .  MacAskill easily did so and walked down the wharf with it, but one of the anchor's flukes caught in one of his shoulders, crippling him. However, this was not the cause of his death, as he lived for many years thereafter.

After a show business career demonstrating his size and strength in Europe and North America, he returned to his home community of Englishtown and purchased a gristmill, a general store and several other properties.

Death

In the summer of 1863, MacAskill undertook a trip to the colonial capital at Halifax, where he had been planning to sell produce and purchase stock for his store that he would need for the winter season from the city's wholesalers.  During the trip, he suddenly became seriously ill and was returned to St. Anns, where his family moved him back to his parents' home.  His original childhood bed was hastily lengthened and put up in their living room to provide for his care.  The doctor's diagnosis was brain fever. After a week's illness, MacAskill died peacefully in his sleep on August 8, 1863, the Presbyterian minister the Rev. Abraham McIntosh and many neighbours being in attendance in the house.

The Halifax Acadian Recorder of August 15, 1863, reported that "the well-known giant... was by far the tallest man in Nova Scotia, perhaps in British America" and that "his mild and gentle manner endeared him to all who had the pleasure of his acquaintance". The whole county mourned and he was buried in the Englishtown Cemetery alongside his parents, who were of average size; the size of MacAskill's burial mound dwarfs those of his mother and father

Museum and legacy
MacAskill's presence lived on in Englishtown for many years where his timber-frame house sat on the edge of Kelly's Mountain, overlooking St. Anns Harbour.  The structure, with its massive door frames still stood, albeit in ruins, as late as the 1950s and the foundation was visible into the 1980s.

Around 1900 the Government of Nova Scotia replaced the family's original grave marker with a new one after the original had fallen into disrepair.  Some of MacAskill's original personal effects from his house, including a bed frame, clothes and chair were removed for preservation and displayed for many years during the mid-20th century at the nearby Gaelic College of Celtic Arts and Crafts. These artifacts were moved back to Englishtown after the "Giant MacAskill Museum" was established in the late 1980s on a road-front portion of MacAskill's former property by the "Giant MacAskill Heirs Association".  In addition to the collection from the Gaelic College, the museum in Englishtown also houses a more expanded collection of artifacts that had been maintained by family members.

The "Giant MacAskill Museum" was also established in 1989 at Dunvegan on the Isle of Skye and is operated there by a community group, this museum having several replicated artifacts from the Englishtown museum. It is managed by Peter MacAskill, father of the street trials cycle rider Danny MacAskill.

In 1977, the new vessel on the Englishtown Ferry, a cable ferry running across the  entrance to St. Anns Harbour between Englishtown and Jersey Cove, was christened as the Angus MacAskill.  Despite the relatively short crossing, it became the busiest ferry service in Nova Scotia, carrying hundreds of thousands of vacationers and residents every year until its replacement in 2008 by the newly built vessel Torquil MacLean.

See also 
 Donald Dinnie
 Angus Graham (strongman)
 Stone put
 Western Isles Strongest man

References

External links
The Tallest Man: Angus MacAskill 
The Human Marvells: ANGUS MACASKILL – The Cape Breton Giant
MacAskill.com

1825 births
1863 deaths
Scottish strength athletes
Canadian strength athletes
Circus strongmen and strongwomen
Scottish emigrants to pre-Confederation Nova Scotia
People from Uist
People from Victoria County, Nova Scotia